Cussey-sur-l'Ognon (literally Cussey on the Ognon) is a commune in the Doubs department in the Bourgogne-Franche-Comté region in eastern France.

Population

See also 
 Ognon river
 Communes of the Doubs department

References

Communes of Doubs